Edward Joseph "Ted" Cleary (18 April 1913 – 6 April 1985) was an Australian cricketer. He played three first-class cricket matches for Victoria in 1934. The son of politician Edward Cleary, he played locally in the Benalla & District Cricket Association as well as for South Melbourne and VCA Colts in Melbourne district cricket.

See also
 List of Victoria first-class cricketers

References

External links
 

1913 births
1985 deaths
Australian cricketers
Victoria cricketers
People from Benalla
South Melbourne cricketers